Truly Exceptional is a live-action educational series of three short films produced in 1979 by Walt Disney Educational to explain the view point of people with disabilities.

Carol Johnston, the gymnast Carol Johnston, born missing part of one arm.
Dan Haley, about a 16-year-old blind boy.
Tom and Virl Osmond about two brothers, born deaf, who founded the company Osmond Entertainment.

References

1979 films
1979 short films
American short films
Short film series
1970s English-language films